No Holds Barred is the second and last album by American gangsta rapper Tweedy Bird Loc.

Track listing 
 "Album Bitch" (Ronnie Phillips, Stank, J, Tweedy Bird Loc)
 "Tweedy for President" (Tweedy Bird Loc)
 "Dub Sacc" (Tweedy Bird Loc)
 "I'm Calling You a Bitch" (Tweedy Bird Loc, 4-Clips) (Queen Latifah diss)
 "Walk That Walk" (Young Soldierz, Keystone, 4-Clips, Lil Leak, Big Stretch, Tweedy Bird Loc)
 "Outta Here" (Tweedy Bird Loc, Lil Leak, Red Rum, Silkski) (KRS-One, Tim Dog, Fat Joe, Vanilla Ice, Everlast, MC Serch, D-Nice, Luke Campbell (of 2 Live Crew), and Big Bank Hank diss)
 "Girls I've Done Fucc Before" (Dog, Skit, Tweedy Bird Loc, Lil Leak, Big Bun, 4-Clips)
 "Keep on Walkin" (Big Wy, Tweedy Bird Loc, 4-Clips)
 "My Dicc Is Still Prejudiced" (Tweedy Bird Loc, Duke, Leroy, Fingaz, D)
 "Gangsta Tweed" (Tweedy Bird Loc)
 "I Got My Strap"(Tweedy Bird Loc)
 "Fucc Miami" (Luke of 2 Live Crew Diss) (Ronnie Phillips, Stank, J, Tweedy Bird Loc, Lil Leak, 4-Clips, Keystone)
 "C Thru the Bullshit" (Tweedy Bird Loc, Baby Bird)
 "Real Gangsta Shit"
 "Y'all Can't Fucc With Us" (Tweedy Bird Loc, Red Rum 781, Duke, Leroy, 4-Clips, Big Bun, Duke-E Fingaz) (Eazy-E & MC Ren Diss)
 "Street Jokes" (Lil Stretch, Troll, Tweedy Bird Loc, 4-Clips, Big Bun, Burnout, Da Marvin)
 "Dangerous Is the Shit" (Lil Stretch, Big Wy, Tweedy Bird Loc, Lil Leak, Red Rum, 4-Clips, Big Stretch, Keystone, Popps)
 "Shout Out" (Tweedy Bird Loc, Big Bun, D. Fingaz, Foe Clips, KeyLow G)

Eazy E responded to "Y'all Can't Fucc With Us"  on the track  "Ole School Shit" from his Str8 Off Tha Streets Of Muthaphuckkin Compton album.  The verse however, was omitted for the final album due to Tweedy having made amends with him before his death.

This album was re-released in 2004, with a slightly different cover, Also the 2004 re release does not include the track "Album Bitch" and instead begins with the track  "Tweedy for President".

Samples 
 "Y'all Can't Fucc With Us" samples "Wild Night" by One Way
  "Dub Sacc" samples "Funky Drummer" by James Brown 
    "Fucc Miami" samples Dre Day by Dr. Dre

References

1994 albums
Tweedy Bird Loc albums